Lizard Lake is a lake located on Vancouver Island and is an expansion of Williams Creek.

References

Alberni Valley
Lakes of Vancouver Island
Lakes of British Columbia
Alberni Land District